William Hall Berry (20 August 1867 – 5 February 1919) was a Scottish footballer who played for Queen's Park and the Scotland national team.

Berry, an inside right, joined Queen's Park from local club Rawcliffe as a teenager and remained with the Glasgow club for the remainder of his football career. He won the Scottish Cup with the club in 1890 and won four caps for the Scotland national team between 1888 and 1891. His younger brother, Davidson, also played for Queen's Park and was also a Scottish internationalist.

References

External links

International stats at Londonhearts.com

1867 births
1919 deaths
Footballers from Glasgow
Scottish footballers
Association football inside forwards
Queen's Park F.C. players
Scotland international footballers